Raj Ballabh Yadav was a leader of Rashtriya Janata Dal (RJD), and member of the Bihar Legislative Assembly in India.

In February 2016, Yadav was booked for raping a minor girl at his home. On December 15, 2018, he was convicted of the offence under the POCSO Act 2012. He has since been suspended from the RJD.

References

Rashtriya Janata Dal politicians
Crime in Bihar
Living people
Bihar MLAs 2015–2020
Year of birth missing (living people)
People from Nawada district